Wild Man From Borneo, sometimes shortened to Wild Man,  (1888 – June 1901) was a half-bred Thoroughbred racehorse that won the 1895 Grand National and was third in the 1894 running.

Background
Wild Man was bred by George Keays at Newton House, Nenagh. His dam, Wild Duck, was a half-Thoroughbred sired by the registered Thoroughbred stallion Sheldrake (seventh in the 1877 St. Leger) out of an unraced half-breed mare. Wild Duck was sold as a four-year-old with the foal Wild Man at foot to J.J Maher. Maher won several steeplechases with Wild Duck, notably the Ward Hunt Cup, before selling her to E. Richardson in 1891, who sold her shortly afterward to a German buyer. Wild Man is Wild Duck's only recorded foal. Maher retained Wild Man until 1893, using him as a hunter initially as a three-year-old and then entering him in steeplechases beginning in April 1892. Wild Man was trained by James Gatland at his Wingrove Stables in Alfriston, Sussex.

Racing career
Wild Man was second in a four-mile Maiden Plate at Punchestown.

Running in the name of Mrs. F. E. Norris, Wild Man finished third to Balmy and Drogheda in the 7 December 1897 Metropolitan Steeplechase at Gatwick.

Retirement
Wild Man From Borneo was retired to his owner's residence in West Derby, Liverpool after his racing career. He died on 1 June 1901 of a fractured pelvis.

Pedigree

References

1888 racehorse births
1901 racehorse deaths
Grand National winners
Byerley Turk sire line
Thoroughbred family B18